The men's C-2 1000 metres competition in canoeing at the 2008 Summer Olympics took place at the Shunyi Olympic Rowing-Canoeing Park in Beijing between August 18 and 22.  The C-2 event was raced in two-man sprint canoes.

Competition consisted of three rounds: the heats, the semifinals and the final. All boats competed in the heats. The top three finishers in each of the two heats advanced directly to the final, while the top nine finishers from both heats moved on to the semifinal. The top three finishers in the semifinal joined the heats winners in the final.

Heats took place on August 18, semifinals on August 20, and the final on August 22.

Medalists

Schedule
All times are China Standard Time (UTC+8)

Results

Heats
Qualification Rules: 1..3->Final, 4..7->Semifinal + 8th best time, Rest Out

Heat 1

Heat 2

Semifinal
Qualification Rules: 1..3->Final, Rest Out

Final

References

Sports-reference.com 2008 C-2 1000 m results.
Yahoo! August 18, 2008 sprint heat results. – accessed August 19, 2008.
Yahoo! August 20, 2008 sprint semifinal results. – accessed August 20, 2008.
Yahoo! August 22, 2008 sprint final results. – accessed August 22, 2008.

Men's C-2 1000
Men's events at the 2008 Summer Olympics